Constant Elisa Pieterse (19 June 1895 – 27 March 1992) was a Dutch rower. He competed at the 1924 Summer Olympics in Paris with the men's single sculls where he was eliminated in the round one repechage. He competed at the 1928 Summer Olympics in Amsterdam with the men's double sculls partnered with Han Cox where they were eliminated in the quarter-final.

References

1895 births
1992 deaths
Dutch male rowers
Olympic rowers of the Netherlands
Rowers at the 1924 Summer Olympics
Rowers at the 1928 Summer Olympics
Rowers from Amsterdam
European Rowing Championships medalists
20th-century Dutch people